Got to Dance, originally titled Just Dance, is a British dance competition that was broadcast on Sky 1 in the United Kingdom from 20 December 2009 to 28 December 2014. Auditions for the show were held in specially built "Dance Domes" and are open to all dance acts of any age, style or size but must be of an amateur level.

The show was hosted by Davina McCall, with Ashley Banjo and Kimberly Wyatt as judges. In series 1 to 3, Adam Garcia was a judge but was replaced by Aston Merrygold in series 4. However, on 31 January 2014, Merrygold announced that he would be leaving the show. Garcia returned as a judge for series 5 in 2014. Since series 2, the prize money is £250,000 for the winning act. On 24 October 2014, it was announced that series 5 would be the last.

Format
There were five stages to the competition:

Stage 1: Producers' auditions (these auditions decide who will perform in front of the judges, but they are not broadcast or acknowledged on the show)
Stage 2: Judges' auditions
Stage 3: Callbacks (some acts may have to perform again at this stage for a place in the semi-finals)
Stage 4: Live Semi-finals (each act performs in one semi-final, with only two advancing to the final, three in series 5)
Stage 5: Live Final

Voting
Viewers in both Ireland and the United Kingdom could vote via Phone, Red Button (through Sky TV only) or via the official iPhone application, which was introduced in the second series. Viewers could vote for free using the Got to Dance website, which was introduced in the fourth series.

Series overview

Series 1 (2010)
Auditions for the first series were held in October 2009 in Edinburgh, Manchester and London.

The winning act, 10-year-old Akai, won the £100,000 prize money.

Semi-finalists

 Jukebox Juniors from Ely
 Bhangra Heads from Coventry
 Emily from Edinburgh 
 Parallel from Uxbridge
 Status from Leeds 
 Martin Sierra from Norway 
Kane Ricca from St Albans 
Raw Edge from Blanchardstown 
Beyond Repair from London 

MJ Latin from Preston
DNA from Telford
Matthew Koon from Whitefield
 Dance Dynamix from Liverpool
 Fancy Feet from Dungannon 
 The Box from Glasgow 
 Unity Youth from East London
 Eclipse from Cardiff
Akai Osei from Lambeth

Semi-finals
The live semi-finals for Got to Dance 2010 began on Sunday 24 January 2010. There were six acts in each live semi-final (18 in total). Each act performed in one semi-final each with only 2 advancing to the final. The judges awarded gold stars to the acts they believed deserved a place in the final and red stars to the ones who have not quite delivered the performance that they were hoping for.

Semi Final 1 (24 January)

Semi Final 2 (31 January)

Semi-final 3 (7 February)

Live Final (14 February)

Series 2 (2011)
A second series of Got to Dance began with a special "Warm Up" show that was broadcast on 19 December 2010 then fully on 2 January 2011. The prize money for the second series was £250,000, the largest cash give-away on a television talent show (at the time).

The format of the second series of Got to Dance was slightly different to the first series. There were eight audition shows followed by four live semi-finals, and a live final at Olympia, London on 27 February 2011 in front of an audience of 6,000 people. The dance dome auditions for the series were held in Glasgow, Dublin & London.

The winning act, Chris and Wes, won the £250,000 prize money.

Callbacks
At the Callbacks, the judges could not decide between eight of the acts so they organised a dance-off to fill the last four semi-final places. The acts in each category had to "face-off" their opponent with one dance; the judges then decided the winner of the each "face-off" and that act went through to the live semi-finals.

The eight acts in the dance-off were:

Alleviate (won) vs Sean and Stacey,
Dance Dynamix (won) vs Frameous,
Lauren Hair (won) vs Natalie,
Addam McMillian vs Crazy Popper (paired as duo named Liquid Metallic)

Semi Finalists

 Alleviate from Flintshire & London
 Back2Back from Wolverhampton
 Bolly-Flex from Tower Hamlets
 Cerebro from Tottenham
 Chris & Wes from Hayes 
 Damhsa Dreams from Geashill
 Dance Dynamix from Liverpool
 Ella from Cornwall
 Elmes 3 Style from Southend-on-Sea
 Eruption from Port Talbot
 Ghetto Fabulous from Dublin
 Guyz in Sync from Walthamstow
 Lauren from Greenock
 Liquid Metallic from various places  

 Luke from Mansfield
 Mystic Force from Galway
 Octavia from Romania
 Podilya from Manchester
 QMX from Nottingham
 Razzle Dazzle from Belfast
 Shockarellas from Trafford
 Synergy from Southampton
 Tamara from Musselburgh
 Tap Attack from various places 
 Trilogy from South London
 Trinity Warriors from Derby
 Turbo from London 
 Two's Company from Belfast

Semi-finals
The live semi-finals for Got to Dance 2011 began on Sunday 30 January 2011. There were seven acts in each live semi-final (28 in total). Each act performed in one semi-final each with only 2 advancing to the final. The judges awarded gold stars to the acts they believed deserved a place in the final.

Semi-final 1 (30 January)

Semi-final 2 (6 February)

Semi-final 3 (13 February)

Semi-final 4 (20 February)

Final
The live final was 90 minutes long (taking place at Olympia) and featured the eight dance acts that made it through the semi-finals as well as a special performance from 2010's winner Akai Osei and dance troupe Diversity. After the acts performed there was a 6-minute window for voting. For the first time in a UK entertainment program, viewers could vote using a specially designed application for the iPhone, iPad and iPod Touch.

Live Final (27 February)

Series 3 (2012)
Series 3 started on 1 January 2012. Producer auditions took place during July & August 2011 in Glasgow, Newcastle, Liverpool, Manchester, Cardiff, Birmingham, Bristol, London and Dublin. Filming took place in various stages from July 2011 – March 2012. The dance domes auditions again took place in London, Glasgow and Dublin.

A special "Warm Up" show was broadcast on 18 December 2011. The series fully began on 1 January 2012, with the next episode the following day. Seven audition shows were aired followed by a "Home Visits" episode and one 30-minute episode featuring the "Callback" performances.

A new show, Got to Dance: Auditions Uncut aired weekdays at 6pm and was narrated by Will Best. As the name suggests, the show featured uncut auditions from the main show and others which were not shown.

The winning act, Prodijig, won the £250,000 prize money.

Semi-finals
The live semi-finals for Got to Dance 2012 began on Sunday 29 January 2012. Five semi-finals took place, instead of four as previously. In total, 30 acts advanced to the semi-finals in 2012.

Semi-finalists

 Unity UK from East London
 Project G from Croydon
 Sam from South Benfleet
 A Hoofer's Song from Worthing
 Hippy-Jo from Halesowen 
 Fear of the Unknown from Glasgow
  Urban Jokers from Doncaster
 Lindsey & Ryan from Norbury
 Luke from Mansfield
 Sapnay from Harrow
 Methods of Movement from Dagenham
 Boadicea from various places 
 Lil Hustlers from Dublin
 Chuck from Urmston
 Supermalcom from London
 
 Brosena from Bristol
 Tayluer & Elliott from Liverpool
 Antics from Solihull
 Bendy Kate from Bristol
 Olivia from Yorkshire
 Sweet Surprise from Cambuslang
 The Future from York
 Rikoshay from Watford
 Lloyd & Rebecca from Ystrad Mynach & West Midlands
 A Team from various places 
 Kazzum from Bedford
 Belle from Herne Bay
 Prodijig from Cork
 Dharmz from Leicester
 Reflection from Bournemouth

Semi-final 1 (29 January)

Semi-final 2 (5 February)

Semi-final 3 (12 February)

Semi-final 4 (19 February)

Semi-final 5 (26 February)

Final
The live final took place at Olympia in front of 6,000 people on 4 March 2012.

Live Final (4 March)

Series 4 (2013)
Series 4 started in January 2013. Producer auditions took place during July and August 2012. This year, auditions in front of the judges took place at Clapham Common in London. No judges' auditions were held in Glasgow or Dublin. The auditions took place between 13 September and 2 October 2012, in a brand new and bigger dome which can hold up to 760 audience members.

Starting in this series, all acts must receive 3 gold stars from the judges to progress onto the shortlist.

Aston Merrygold replaced Garcia on the judging panel. Jordan Banjo and Perri Kiely were the backstage team for series 4. They also provided the voice overs for many of the episodes of Got to Dance: Auditions Uncut.

Producer audition dates:

Semi-finals
The live semi-finals for Got to Dance 2013 began on Sunday 10 February 2013. Five semi-finals took place, with six acts performing in each for one of two places in the Grand Final on 17 March.

Semi-finalists

Final
The live final took place at Olympia in front of 6,000 people on 17 March 2013.

Live Final (17 March)

Series 5 (2014)
Series 5 began airing on 9 August 2014, with McCall continuing as host. Banjo and Wyatt returned as judges for a fifth time and Garcia returned after his absence in series 4, replacing Merrygold. In this series, the semi-finals were stripped across one week (similar to Britain's Got Talent) and the judges mentored contestants throughout the competition. Six acts from each team progressed to the live rounds. Auditions for this series took place at the Roundhouse concert venue in Camden, London between 6–11 May 2014. This is the first and only time that the dance domes have not been used. Series 2 winners Chris and Wes returned to Got to Dance and were joined by Joe Sugg to form the Backstage/Online team.

Producer auditions for Got to Dance 2014 took place during March and April 2014 in London, Birmingham, Cardiff, Manchester, Newcastle, Glasgow and Dublin.

Producer audition dates:

Semi-finalists
The following 18 acts made it to the live shows:

Finalists
The following 9 acts made it to the live final on 29 August 2014:

Key: 
 – Winning judge/team. Winner is in bold, eliminated contestants in small font.

Got to Dance bursary fund
The second series saw the introduction of the bursary fund. This fund, worth £15,000, was to be distributed amongst auditionees that the judges felt weren't yet good enough to progress in the competition, but whom they felt had real potential, and was to be used to enable them to develop and cultivate their dance skills through professional tuition.

Transmissions

Warm-up shows

Original series

Ratings
Episode ratings from BARB. They do not include viewings on Sky 1 +1.

Series 1

Series 2

Series 3

Series 4

Series 5

International versions
Colour key
 In production (0)  
 Discontinued (7)  
 Not aired (1)  

Current and upcoming versions include:

US version

CBS announced on 10 April 2010 that there was going to be an American version of the series titled Live to Dance and was set to rival So You Think You Can Dance. The show premiered on the said channel on 4 January 2011 and was cancelled a month later in the same year. Kimberly Wyatt also served as a judge on Live to Dance.

Polish version

A Polish version premiered 2 March 2012 on Polsat, titled Got to Dance - Tylko Taniec. Second edition aired from 7 September to 9 November 2012. A third edition began on 1 March 2013 and a fourth in September 2013. Since March 2011, Polsat have also produced a local version of Must Be the Music (which was first aired on Sky1 in 2010) and has aired its sixth edition. Both shows air two seasons a year in Poland.

Australian version
Plans for an Australian version of the show were announced in April 2012. It was expected to premiere on the Australian cable channel Fox8 later in 2012, with Andrew Günsberg as the host. However, it was announced in June 2012 that the show was cancelled due to a scheduling conflict with another dance show Everybody Dance Now on Network Ten.

German version
The German version premiered on 20 June 2013 on ProSieben, with the remaining shows being broadcast on Sat.1. Johanna Klum hosts the show while Palina Rojinski, Nikeata Thompson and Howard Donald are the judges. A second season was aired in 2014 and a third in 2015.

See also
So You Think You Can Dance
Must Be the Music 
Strictly Come Dancing
Dancing on Ice
Britain's Got Talent

References

External links
Official website

2009 British television series debuts
2014 British television series endings
Dance competition television shows
Sky UK original programming
English-language television shows
Television series by Banijay